A special election was held in the U.S. state of Minnesota on February 12, 2013 to elect a new representative for District 14A in the Minnesota House of Representatives, caused by the resignation of Representative Steve Gottwalt on January 7, 2013. A primary election was not held. The election coincided with the District 19A special election. Tama Theis, the Republican Party of Minnesota nominee, won the special election.

Background
On January 3, 2013, Representative Steve Gottwalt announced that he would resign to take a job as the director of state legislative policy for the Center for Diagnostic Imaging. He resigned on January 7, 2013, the day before the beginning of the new session of the Minnesota Legislature.

Candidates

Minnesota Democratic–Farmer–Labor Party

Nominee
Joanne Dorsher (party endorsed), former St. Cloud school board member

Declined
Jerry McCarter, former candidate for the Minnesota Senate

Republican Party of Minnesota

Nominee
Tama Theis (party endorsed), small business owner

Withdrawn
Scott Mac Hardy, Iraq War veteran
James Parmele
John Severson, former St. Cloud city council member

Independence Party of Minnesota

Nominee
Todd McKee, small business owner; part-time truck driver

Results

Previous election results

References

External links
Information on the special election at the Minnesota Secretary of State website

Official campaign websites
Joanne Dorsher
Tama Theis

House of Representatives
Minnesota special elections